WNYO-TV (channel 49) is a television station in Buffalo, New York, United States, affiliated with MyNetworkTV. It is owned by Sinclair Broadcast Group alongside Fox affiliate WUTV (channel 29). Both stations share studios on Hertel Avenue near Military Road in Buffalo, while WNYO-TV's transmitter is located on Whitehaven Road (near I-190) in Grand Island, New York.

The construction permit for channel 49 was issued in 1984 and changed hands twice before the station went on the air on September 1, 1987, as WNYB-TV. While TVX Broadcast Group handled much of the construction of the station, the company made another purchase that forced it to sell the unbuilt WNYB-TV to remain under national ownership limits. The first owner of the station was Aud Enterprises, a division of the Buffalo Sabres hockey team; channel 49 aired Sabres road games and served as the Fox affiliate from 1989 to 1990. It also lost an average of $1 million a year. In 1990, under a deal brokered the previous year, the Sabres games, Fox programming, and syndicated shows seen on WNYB-TV moved to WUTV, with Tri-State Christian Television (TCT) buying channel 49 to broadcast Christian programming.

TCT sold WNYB-TV to Grant Broadcasting in 1996; the deal included TCT's acquisition of a dormant station on channel 26 in Jamestown, which became the new WNYB. In October 1996, Grant relaunched channel 49 as WNYO-TV, the Buffalo affiliate of The WB. Sinclair purchased the station in 2000, forming a duopoly with WUTV. The station produced its own local newscast from 2004 to 2006 as part of Sinclair's News Central service and then aired local news programming produced for it by Buffalo NBC affiliate WGRZ from 2006 to 2013. WNYO-TV is Buffalo's ATSC 3.0 (NextGen TV) station; in reciprocal arrangements, other Buffalo TV stations broadcast its subchannels on its behalf while it carries them in the new format.

History
Channel 49 was added to Buffalo in lieu of channel 76 in February 1966 as part of a national overhaul of UHF channel allocations. The Beta Television Corporation obtained the construction permit that June, but despite attempts to sell the permit to Evans Broadcasting Corporation and New York City's WPIX, as well as a call sign change from WBAU-TV to WBBU-TV, the construction permit was deleted in January 1971.

Permitting
In 1979, interest coalesced again around channel 49, with applicants investigating the possibility of building a station to broadcast subscription television (STV) programming to paying customers. The first formal application filed with the Federal Communications Commission (FCC) came from Anax Corporation in June. A group of California investors doing business as the Great Erie County Telecasting Corporation made its application in October, followed by Channel 49 Buffalo Television, owned by an investor consortium from Baltimore, the minority-owned Unific Broadcasting Company, and Bison City Television 49, whose principals were primarily from St. Louis.

In 1981, the FCC designated the applications for comparative hearing; Bison City's application was initially dismissed by an FCC administrative law judge because of a failure to established ownership, but the company successfully appealed. The field thinned considerably when Unific settled with Anax, Great Erie County, and Channel 49 Buffalo Television at the start of the hearing, leaving Unific and Bison City the only contenders for the permit. While Unific believed its local ownership and proposal to feature programming for the Black community in Buffalo made it a superior applicant, administrative law judge Walter C. Miller selected Bison City over Unific; the primary reason was that the latter company had asked for four amendments to its financial qualifications due to an inability to secure financing.

Bison City made some progress at building channel 49; it attempted to secure financing in order to go on air in 1984, and it even purchased some syndicated programs for the station to air. In 1985, the station secured a tower site in Colden over the objections of some local residents, and Bison City engaged the services of Media Central of Chattanooga, Tennessee, to build the facilities on its behalf, with the call sign WNYB-TV selected.

TVX: ownership but not operation
Lacking the financial resources to build the station, Bison City sold 80 percent interest in the WNYB construction permit to TVX Broadcast Group, a chain of independent TV stations, in 1985. TVX proceeded with construction, but a change in its business plan put the station on hold. In November 1986, TVX acquired five major-market independents from Taft Broadcasting. Including the under-construction WNYB-TV but excluding WNRW-TV in North Carolina, which it was selling, it owned eight stations prior to the deal; the combined total of 13 stations put TVX over the 12-station limit of the time. TVX announced its intention to sell the WNYB-TV construction permit.

In May 1987, TVX reached a deal to sell WNYB-TV to a subsidiary of the First Allied Corporation, owned by Malcolm Glazer of Rochester. First Allied, in turn, announced that WNYB-TV would begin broadcasting on July 1 from the under-construction studios on Hertel Avenue. However, by late June, the sale to First Allied had fallen through, and the start of the station had been delayed until September to align with the start of the new television season as well as contracts for much of the new outlet's programming.

Sabres ownership
Needing to dispose of a ready-to-operate television station, TVX reportedly approached the Buffalo Sabres, the city's National Hockey League (NHL) franchise, among other groups. The Sabres were the only U.S. NHL team whose games aired on a major network affiliate—WGRZ (channel 2), Buffalo's NBC station—and that station expressed waning interest in renewing its partnership with the hockey club because it had to preempt network programming for Sabres games. The deal for Aud Enterprises, a subsidiary of the team, to purchase WNYB-TV was announced on July 20, 1987. While WGRZ had the right to match channel 49's offer to air the Sabres, the franchise changed the number of games to be aired from 24 to 29, dissuading the network affiliate from exercising its option.

Even though Citadel Communications, owner of competing independent WUTV, alleged that the involvement of Robert E. Rich Jr. in the Sabres and Rich Products, a minority stockholder in two Buffalo radio stations, violated cross-ownership rules, the FCC discarded Citadel's complaint and approved the transfer to Aud Enterprises on September 1, 1987. That evening, WNYB-TV broadcast for the first time. The deal formally closed in early November. The $4.63 million purchase price represented the value of the property, as construction permits could not be sold at a profit under FCC regulation. In addition to syndicated reruns and movies, as well as the Sabres, WNYB-TV aired Buffalo Bisons minor-league baseball.

Fox and WUTV had a falling out in 1989 over performance of the network's programming in the Buffalo market. Fox contended that WUTV was underperforming other affiliates for its network programming. Further, WUTV felt that the airing of Fox programming by CHCH-TV in Hamilton, Ontario, with what its general manager called the approval of the Fox network, caused unnecessary duplication because of the proximity of Hamilton to Buffalo and the availability of the Hamilton station on Buffalo-area cable systems. It also caused CHCH to be able to invoke simultaneous substitution of WUTV during Fox programs it carried, cutting into the station's ability to sell advertising against its large Canadian audience. WNYB-TV replaced WUTV in the network effective September 1, 1989; it did not have the Canadian cable carriage of WUTV and did not depend financially on advertising revenue from Canada. This also left it far less financially lucrative; in two years of operation, WNYB-TV lost an average of $1 million a year, and from launch to April 1990, the team had lost $8.5 million on the station.

Consolidation with WUTV; sale to TCT
In August 1989, Act III Broadcasting moved to purchase WUTV from Citadel. However, it soon put the purchase on hold temporarily to negotiate a second acquisition: that of WNYB-TV's programming and facilities. Act III had pulled off a similar station consolidation the year before in Richmond, Virginia, when it bought WRLH-TV as well as the programming inventory of competitor WVRN-TV, which then shut down.

On August 29, 1989, Act III announced that it would buy WUTV along with WNYB-TV's programming and Fox affiliation, which would move to channel 29. Simultaneously, the Sabres announced that channel 49's transmitting facility would be sold to Tri-State Christian Television (TCT) of Marion, Illinois. In exchange, Sabres owners Seymour Knox and Robert Swados received equity in WUTV and would move their road games from channel 49 to channel 29, where they would have the exposure on Canadian cable that WNYB-TV had lacked since launching. The pair of deals would together reimburse the Sabres for their losses in running WNYB-TV. Approval of this set of transactions, however, was not certain. Act III owned WUHF in Rochester, with which WUTV's signal contour overlapped. This combination required a waiver from the FCC. It also faced objections from commercial stations WIVB-TV in Buffalo and WROC-TV in Rochester, as well as Stevens Media Services of Buffalo, which decried the monopolizing of the UHF television market and took issue with the overlap between the stations.

In June 1990, the FCC approved of the WUTV sale to Act III, granting a one-year waiver to Act III to allow it to sell off WUHF; it had already approved of the WNYB-TV sale to TCT in November 1989. WNYB-TV's programming, including Fox shows, was immediately merged onto WUTV's schedule, and TCT took over channel 49 on June 28, 1990, airing Christian ministry programming.

Grant ownership
The structure of the purchase of WNYB-TV by TCT incentivized Tri-State Christian Television to continue the station as a non-profit for five years by including a series of sliding scale payments to the Sabres that increased if the station began accepting commercial advertising or was sold to a commercial broadcaster. With the five years up, in December 1995, TCT made a deal with Grant Broadcasting. The deal would see Grant buy channel 49 from TCT, which would receive $12 million and the construction permit for WTJA in Jamestown, which had last broadcast in 1991.

Speculation immediately pointed to Grant using channel 49 to bring The WB to Buffalo, which was confirmed in June 1996. While TCT began the process of building a full new physical plant to bring channel 26 back into service and moved the WNYB call letters there, Grant returned channel 49 to commercial broadcasting as WNYO-TV in October 1996. The Sabres also briefly returned to channel 49, airing a 10-game package simulcast from Empire Sports Network in the 1997–98 season. However, channel 49 could not live up to the O in its new call sign, for Ontario. The Sabres had made the deal in part because the station had hoped to be added to southern Ontario cable systems beginning in January 1998. However, that approval never came. In April 1998, the Canadian Radio-television and Telecommunications Commission denied permission for the companies to add WNYO-TV to their lineups, siding with Toronto stations in finding that the addition of another non-Canadian service would deprive Canadian broadcasters of revenue. Grant expanded the relationship with The WB in 1999, when it ceased airing its programming on Superstation WGN nationally, by obtaining WB secondary affiliations for three of his other stations.

Sinclair ownership

Grant Broadcasting sold WNYO-TV to Sinclair Broadcast Group—the descendant of the original Baltimore group that had sought the channel in 1979—for $51.5 million in 2000. The company had previously reportedly turned down an offer from Granite Broadcasting, owner of ABC affiliate WKBW-TV. This formed a duopoly with WUTV and came after Sinclair had previously backed out of a plan to acquire channel 23 in the city. Unlike with channel 23, in acquiring WNYO-TV, it acquired an existing station with a building, programming, and staff. The deal also allowed Sinclair to program channel 49 with shows it had purchased with the intent of airing them on channel 23.

In 2006, when The WB and UPN merged to form The CW, Sinclair first elected to affiliate with MyNetworkTV, a new network started by Fox Television Stations, over The CW. On March 2, ten days after the network's existence was announced on February 22, Sinclair affiliated 17 stations it owned or managed, including WNYO-TV, with the network.

Newscasts
In 2003, WNYO-TV announced it would begin airing a 10 p.m. local newscast utilizing Sinclair's hybrid News Central format; a local anchor read stories from Buffalo, while national news and weather were provided from Sinclair's corporate office in Hunt Valley, Maryland. The hour-long program debuted on August 16, 2004. The primary competition for the newscast was WNLO, which aired a newscast produced by WIVB-TV; WUTV, unlike most Fox affiliates, had not bothered to begin airing local news programming because it aired successful syndicated shows in the 10 p.m. hour. The station had toyed with airing such a program since 2000. The program was later shortened to 30 minutes.

In January 2006, Sinclair ended its standalone news operation at WPGH-TV in Pittsburgh and triggered speculation about the future of the WNYO-TV newscast. The program was then wound down at the end of March, and WGRZ began producing a new half-hour news and sports program for the station in late April. The half-hour consisted of two programs: 2 News on 49, a 10-minute local newscast recapping the day's top stories, and Western New York Sports Zone, a 20-minute in-depth sports show. The change brought only a slight improvement in local ratings. The sports portion was later downsized, which did lead to a ratings increase.

The WGRZ-produced newscast moved to sister station WUTV on April 8, 2013, trading places with the reruns of Seinfeld that had aired in that time slot on WUTV since the mid-1990s. WNYO-TV continued to air news programming, as a rebroadcast of the 6 a.m. hour of WGRZ's morning newscast aired weekdays at 7 a.m. on WNYO-TV, which began on April 8; plans called for this rebroadcast to also move to WUTV at some point in the future. WGRZ continued to produce the newscast for air on channel 29 until July 2021, when Sinclair opted to instead produce the newscast using presentation resources at co-owned stations in nearby markets.

National news and current affairs programming on the station consists of Sinclair-produced The National Desk and Full Measure with Sharyl Attkisson as well as The Armstrong Williams Show.

Technical information

Subchannels
The station's ATSC 1.0 channels are carried on the multiplexed digital signals of other Buffalo television stations:

Analog-to-digital conversion
WNYO-TV discontinued regular programming on its analog signal, over UHF channel 49, on June 12, 2009, the official date in which full-power television stations in the United States transitioned from analog to digital broadcasts under federal mandate. The station's digital signal relocated from its pre-transition UHF channel 34 to channel 49.

ATSC 3.0 lighthouse
WNYO-TV is Buffalo's ATSC 3.0 (NextGen TV) lighthouse station and hosts itself and the Big Four stations in the market in that format. The station converted on March 22, 2021.

Notes

References

External links

ATSC 3.0 television stations
MyNetworkTV affiliates
Stadium (sports network) affiliates
Comet (TV network) affiliates
GetTV affiliates
Sinclair Broadcast Group
Television channels and stations established in 1987
NYO-TV
1987 establishments in New York (state)